Dave Pichette (born February 4, 1960) is a Canadian former  professional ice hockey player who played 322 games in the National Hockey League. He played with the Quebec Nordiques, St. Louis Blues, New Jersey Devils, and New York Rangers. As a youth, he played in the 1972 and 1973 Quebec International Pee-Wee Hockey Tournaments with a minor ice hockey team from Sainte-Foy, Quebec City.

Career statistics

References

External links

1960 births
Living people
Canadian ice hockey defencemen
Cape Breton Oilers players
Fredericton Express players
Halifax Citadels players
Hershey Bears players
Ice hockey people from Newfoundland and Labrador
Krefeld Pinguine players
Maine Mariners players
New Haven Nighthawks players
New Jersey Devils players
New York Rangers players
People from Grand Falls-Windsor
Quebec Nordiques players
Quebec Remparts players
St. Louis Blues players
Undrafted National Hockey League players
Canadian expatriate ice hockey players in Germany